Bhavna Makwana is a Member of Legislative assembly from Talaja constituency in Gujarat for its 12th legislative assembly.

References

Living people
Gujarat MLAs 2007–2012
Bharatiya Janata Party politicians from Gujarat
Year of birth missing (living people)